Tortosa railway station is the central railway station of Tortosa, Spain. The station is part of Adif and it accommodates RENFE Avant high-speed and Rodalies de Catalunya medium-distance trains.

References 

Railway stations in Catalonia
Rodalies de Catalunya stations
Railway stations in Spain opened in 1865